Endotricha convexa is a species of snout moth in the genus Endotricha. It is found in China (Hainan).

The forewings are purplish red in males. The hindwings are concolorous to the forewings except for a whitish yellow area anteriorly.

Etymology
The specific epithet is derived from the Latin convexus (meaning convex) and refers to the forewing hump.

References

Moths described in 2012
Endemic fauna of Hainan
Endotrichini